Bustrengo (also Bustreng) is a cake dish in  Romagnol and Sammarinese cuisine and a traditional Christmas dish in the Republic of San Marino, in the provinces of Forlì-Cesena and Rimini, which are in Emilia-Romagna and partly in the region of Marche. It is consumed at all times of the year. Ingredients include standard cake ingredients such as flour, leavening, oil or shortening, sugar or honey, etc. along with cornmeal, bread crumbs or stale bread, figs, raisins, diced apples, lemon rind and orange rind. It is typically a dense and moist cake.

Traditional preparation of bustrengo involves cooking it in a fireplace in a copper pot with the lid covered in hot coals.

See also

 List of cakes
 List of Christmas dishes

References

Cakes
Sammarinese cuisine
Italian desserts
Christmas cakes